Edmundo Eluchans Urenda (born 21 January 1950) is a Chilean politician who served as President of the Chamber of Deputies and as a member of the Chamber of Deputies, representing Districts 14 and 15 of the Valparaíso Region.

References

1950 births
Living people
Presidents of the Chamber of Deputies of Chile
National Party (Chile, 1966) politicians
Independent Democratic Union politicians
Pontifical Catholic University of Chile alumni
21st-century Chilean politicians
People from Valparaíso
20th-century Chilean lawyers